Toronto is a village in County Durham, England. It is situated a mile to the north-west of Bishop Auckland and was represented in Wear Valley District Council until that authority was merged into Durham County Council in April 2009. In the 2001 census Toronto had a population of 399.

History 

The village is named after Toronto, Ontario, Canada. The name is derived from the Mohawk word tkaronto, meaning "place where trees stand in the water". A coal baron with land in County Durham was visiting the Canadian city when he was told that coal had been discovered under his land. He therefore decided to call the mine Toronto, whence the village also took its name.

Geography
Toronto is located on a plateau north west of Bishop Auckland in a loop of the River Wear.

Demographics
Population in the village is similar to Bishop Auckland, predominantly white. The village consists of houses, mostly in traditional brick-built terraces, surrounded by agricultural land.

References

External links
 Durham Mining Museum entry on Toronto (Newton Cap) Colliery

Villages in County Durham